Igor Skorokhodov (born May 4, 1986) is a Russian former professional ice hockey forward who played in the Kontinental Hockey League (KHL). He most notably played with HC Yugra for 6 seasons.

During the 2018–19 season, Skorokhodov returned to HC Yugra in their first season of the transition to the VHL. He earned 1 assist in 8 games before opting to immediately end his 12 year professional career on October 25, 2018.

References

External links

1986 births
Living people
HC Lada Togliatti players
Metallurg Novokuznetsk players
Salavat Yulaev Ufa players
Severstal Cherepovets players
HC Yugra players
HC Vityaz players
Russian ice hockey right wingers